Tiempos compulsivos is an Argentine miniseries. Created by Adrián Suar, written by Javier Daulte, produced by Pol-ka and it was issued by Canal 13 from August 29, 2012 until March 7, 2013. It stars Rodrigo de la Serna, Paola Krum, Fernán Mirás, Gloria Carrá, Juan Minujín, Marilú Marini, Carla Peterson, Marcelo D'Andrea, Maruja Bustamante, Pilar Gamboa, Guillermo Arengo and Julieta Vallina.

Plot 
Tiempos compulsivos happens in a therapeutic space that houses outpatients with severe compulsions, some associated with pathologies in the psychiatric environment. The experienced Dr. Ricardo Buso (Fernán Mirás) will be in charge of a group of people with ailments of various kinds, Inés Alonso (Carla Peterson) compulsive to accumulation, obsessive of order and with eating disorders, Teresa Guglietti (Gloria Carrá) she has multiple personalities, always bidding to prevail over one another, Esteban Soldeyra (Rodrigo de la Serna) a mythomaniac psychopath but with an overwhelming lucidity, Gerardo Romero (Guillermo Arengo) workaholic and constant connectivity and Sofía Muntabski (Pilar Gamboa) she has her body plagued with wounds and scars that she inflicts herself to dull deeper pains. In daily group meetings, Ricardo will try to alleviate the discomfort that afflicts his patients, along with his faithful colleague and friend, Ezequiel Lambert (Juan Minujín) and a new doctor who joins this multidisciplinary work the psychologist Julieta Despeyroux (Paola Krum) This team of professionals will make them face their fears, their anguishes and desires, being the axis of their own dramas and, sometimes, the reflection or multiplication of the trauma of the other. In some moments, the therapists will observe them through the mirrored glass of the Chamber of Gesell, without this meaning that on one side there are the healthy and on the other the sick, doctors also suffer and will have to fight against their "own ghosts” similar to those that alter the well-being of their patients.

Cast

Protagonists 
 Fernán Mirás as Ricardo Buso
 Carla Peterson as Inés Alonso 
 Gloria Carrá as Teresa Guglietti 
 Rodrigo de la Serna as Esteban Soldeyra
 Juan Minujín as Ezequiel Lambert 
 Paola Krum as Julieta Despeyroux 
 Guillermo Arengo as Gerardo Romero
 Pilar Gamboa as Sofía Muntabski

Co-protagonists 
 Marilú Marini as May Lapage
 Marcelo D'Andrea as Silvio
 Maruja Bustamante as Gaby
 Julieta Vallina as Clara Arismendi

Participations 
 Arturo Goetz as Gregorio Soldeyra
 Gonzalo Heredia as Fabián Mineli
 Romina Gaetani as Tania
 Florencia Peña as Lara
 Rafael Spregelburd as Sebastián
 Carola Reyna as Anita
 María Abadi as Julieta
 Sofía Brito as Adriana
 Diego Rosental as Julito

References

Pol-ka telenovelas
2012 Argentine television series debuts
2013 Argentine television series endings